Knuppel is a surname of German origin. Notable people with the surname include:

August Knuppel (1857-1929), German-born American mason, contractor and politician
Bernd Knuppel (born 1962), Uruguayan sailor
John Linebaugh Knuppel (1923-1986), American politician 
Thomas (Tom) Knuppel (1951) Illinois educator and family genealogist

References

Surnames of German origin